St. Lupicin is a locality within the Municipality of Lorne in south central Manitoba, Canada.  It is located approximately 35 kilometers (22 miles) southwest of Carman, Manitoba.

See also 
List of regions of Manitoba
List of rural municipalities in Manitoba

References 

Localities in Manitoba
Manitoba communities with majority francophone populations